Enispa oblataria is a moth of the family Erebidae first described by Francis Walker in 1861. It is found in Sri Lanka.

References

External links
Kononenko V. S. & A. Pinratana. Moth of Thailand Vol. 3, Part 2. Noctuoidea. An illustrated Catalogue of Erebidae, Nolidae, Euteliidae and Noctuidae (Insecta, Lepidoptera) in Thailand

Moths of Asia
Moths described in 1913
Boletobiinae